The International Turntablist Federation (ITF) was an organization which held a series of DJ battles during the rise of turntablism in the late 90s and early 2000s. The ITF is notable for introducing the concept of category competitions. The categories included advancement, scratching, beat juggling, and team.

The ITF eventually evolved into the IDA, but during its height in the early 2000s, the ITF was considered a close second to the DMC in the world of international DJ battles. Many of the winners (e.g., A-Trak, Craze, i.e. Merge, Rafik, and C2C) were prominent members of the turntablist community and were champions in other competitions.

Advancement Category Winners
 1996 - Total Eclipse - First ITF battle
 1997 - Vinroc
 1998 - Vinroc
 1999 - A-Trak
 2000 - A-Trak
 2001 - Woody - First European ITF Champion
 2002 - Kodh
 2003 - Tiger Style
 2004 - Rafik
 2005 - Pro Zeiko

Scratch Category Winners
 1997 - Babu
 1998 - Craze
 1999 - Prime Cuts
 2000 - Prime Cuts
 2001 - Spryte One
 2002 - i.e. Merge
 2003 - Flip     
 2004 - Rafik
 2005 - Rafik

Beat Juggling Category Winners
 1997 - Babu 
 1998 - Develop
 1999 - Lil Jaz
 2000 - Infamous
 2001 - Jr. Flo
 2002 - Troubl
 2003 - Kid Fresh 
 2004 - Rasgunyado
 2005 - Pro Zeiko

Team Category Winners
 1997 - Beat Junkies
 1998 - Beat Junkies 
 1999 - Allies
 2000 - Scratch Action Hiro
 2001 - Nocturnal Sound Crew 
 2002 - Nocturnal Sound Crew
 2003 - Lordz of Fitness
 2004 - Lordz of Fitness
 2005 - C2C

Experimental Category Winners

 2005 J-RED (World's first Visual routine)

References

Turntablism